Walter Dottyn (c. 1554–1635), of Totnes, Devon, was an English politician.

He was a Member (MP) of the Parliament of England for Totnes in 1604.

References

1550s births
1635 deaths
Members of the Parliament of England (pre-1707) for Totnes
English MPs 1604–1611